Encephalitozoon intestinalis is a parasite. It can cause microsporidiosis.

It is notable as having one of the smallest genome among known eukaryotic organisms, containing only 2.25 million base pairs. Its genome was completely sequenced in 2010.

E. intestinalis originally named Septata intestinalis, was reclassified based on morphologic, antigenic
and molecular similarities with other species of the genus Encephalitozoon. Recently, Some domestic
and wild animals have been found to be naturally infected with E. intestinalis and some other
microsporidian species.

E. intestinalis is transmitted in contaminated water. It causes Gastro-Intestinal tract infection which
subsequently leads to diarrhea and circulates to the ocular, genitourinary and respiratory tracts.
Research has proven that E. intestinalis infection can increase host cell nuclear mutation rate.

Disease 
Microsporidia are obligate intracellular opportunistic fungi that cause significant pathology in
immunocompromised (simply put: having an impaired immune system) hosts. Like other
obligate intracellular pathogens, microsporidia exert significant stress on infected host cells.
Microsporidia infection alters host cell cycle regulation and can lead to development of
multinucleated host cells.

Genome 
Compared to E. cuniculi which encodes about 2000 massive genes at 2.9 Mbp, E. intestinalis had a reduced gene complement and genome size (2.3 Mbp) because of a high degree of host dependency. E. intestinalis lack large gene blocks of sequence in its subtelomeric regions unlike E. cuniculi. However, E. intestinalis and E. cuniculi share a conserved gene content, order and density
over most of their genomes which have similar GC content. They also contain the same
complement of transfer RNAs and ribosomal RNAs.

Detection 
The assay is adaptable to the clinical laboratory and represents the first real‐time PCR assay
designed to detect Encephalitozoon species. Melting temperature analysis of the amplicons
allows for the differentiation of three Encephalitozoon species (E. intestinalis, E. cuniculi,  and E.hellem).

Prevention and Treatment 
Frequent washing of hands and limited exposure to animals is highly recommended especially for
people with immunesystem deficiency.  Treatment of Microsporidia can vary depending on the
species involved. Intravenous fluid administration, electrolyte repletion, dietary and nutritional
regimens can be helpful to patients with diarrhea while antiretroviral therapy can help improve
immune system function.

References 

Parasitic fungi
Microsporidia